Garretson may refer to:

 Garretson (surname)
 Garretson, South Dakota, United States
 Garretson School District, South Dakota, United States 
 Garretson W. Gibson (1832–1910), President of Liberia